Stevan Zdravković (Zivica, Principality of Serbia, 16 April 1835 - Belgrade, Kingdom of Serbia, 4 August 1900) was a Serbian general, professor and chief of the Serbian Military Academy in Belgrade, Minister of Public Works and State Adviser

Zdravković was also a regular member of the Committee for Natural and Mathematical Sciences since 24 January 1871 and the Committee for the Dissemination of Science and Literature to the People since 1883; Secretary of the Committee for Natural and Mathematical Sciences (1881–1883); and honorary member since November 15, 1892.He also served as the 6th Dean of the Academic Board of the Military Academy in Serbia from 1880 to 1887. In 1897 he was named president of The Red Cross of Serbia, a post he held until 1899 when he was succeeded by Dragutin Franasović.

A year before the start of Serbian Wars for Independence, Zdravković held the rank of lieutenant colonel at the Serbian General Staff Headquarters and was Ranko Alimpić's subordinate.

See also
 František Zach
 Mihailo Ilić (major)
 Ranko Alimpić
 Milojko Lešjanin
 Jovan Petrović (general)
 Leonid Solarević
 Svetomir Matić
 Josif Kostić
 Vladimir Cukavac

References 

Politicians from Belgrade
Interior ministers of Serbia
1835 births
1900 deaths